Farhad Mann is an American director, screenwriter of film, television and commercials, and owner of the production company FMPI.

Mann has directed episodes for television series such as Beauty & the Beast, The Listener, Murdoch Mysteries, and Aaron Stone, as well as many television films. Notable feature films he has directed include Lawnmower Man 2: Beyond Cyberspace (which he also wrote) for New Line Cinema, and Fighting for Freedom. The pilot episode of Max Headroom ("Blipverts") that he directed for ABC won several Emmys. The next pilot he directed, Nick Knight, was developed by CBS into the long-running Forever Knight.

Mann directed the TV movie adaption of Dean Koontz's novel, The Face of Fear. He most recently directed the TV movies A Mother's Crime, The Past Never Dies, and A Killer In My Home.

Mann is also the creator and owner of the Los Angeles-based commercial production company FMPI, a producer of campaigns for domestic and international clients.

Early life and education
Mann earned his Masters Film Degree with Distinction at the ArtCenter College of Design in Pasadena. His student film "Frames", a short black comedy about an obsessed filmmaker and his girlfriend, won an Emmy and 17 international First Place awards, including at the New York Film Festival. Director Lee Strasberg saw Frames on Showtime and invited Mann to study in his Masters Program where he directed several theatrical productions.

Personal life
Mann lives in Los Angeles, California. He enjoys all aspects of the arts including: film, theatre, music, and visual arts.

Company
FMPI is a company that produces commercials, television, feature films and integrated media.

Filmography

Commercials
Mann has directed several trendsetting commercials for multiple national campaigns. These include Pepsi, Budweiser, Coors, McDonald's, Coca-Cola, Toyota, American Express, Chevrolet, and also for several agencies including Saatchi & Saatchi, Ogilvy & Mather, Grey Worldwide, DDB Worldwide, McCann-Erickson, J. Walter Thompson, Leo Burnett, Young and Rubicam.

These commercials have won many awards including, Clios, International film & TV festival of New York, Houston International film festival, IFPA CINDY award, Art Director's Club of New York, and U.S. Television Commercials Festival Chicago.

References

External links

Farhad Mann Production website
Farhad Mann website

Living people
Place of birth missing (living people)
American directors
American film directors
American cinematographers
American screenwriters
Year of birth missing (living people)